Bayʿah ("Pledge of allegiance"), in Islamic terminology, is an oath of allegiance to a leader. It is known to have been practiced by the Islamic prophet Muhammad. Bayʿah is sometimes taken under a written pact given on behalf of the subjects by leading members of the tribe with the understanding that as long as the leader abides by certain requirements towards his people, they are to maintain their allegiance to him. Bayʿah is still practiced in countries such as Saudi Arabia and Sudan. In Morocco, bayʿah is one of the foundations of the monarchy.

Etymology
Bay'ah derives from the Semitic triconsonantal root B-Y-’, related to commerce, and shows the contractual nature of the bond between caliph and the people. Bay'ah originally referred to the striking together of hands between buyer and seller to mark an agreement.

In Islamic history 

The tradition of bayʿah can be traced back to the era of the Prophet Muhammad. From the beginning, bayʿah was taken by Muhammad as an oath of allegiance. Anybody who wanted to join the growing Islamic community did so by reciting the basic creed expressing faith in the oneness of God and the prophethood of Muhammad. However, this differed from the proclamation of faith necessary to become an individual Muslim. In addition to this, the Prophet formally took bayʿah from the people and tribes. Through this formal act, they were absorbed by the community and showed willingness to obey Muhammad. The text of the oath varies in different traditions, but often contains the Shahada and prayers of repentance.

It is reported that at annual gatherings outside Mecca, Muhammad met people from Yathrib (later renamed Medina), who accepted his call towards Islam. Muhammad then took bayʿah from them.

In Sunni Islam, the Bayʿah rite continued to be used throughout history to mark a caliph's accession, first in the Rashidun Caliphate (the Bayʿah of Abu Bakr occasioning the Shi'a-Sunni split), then throughout the Dynastic Caliphates (Umayyad, Abbasid and Ottoman). With the abolition of the Caliphate, Bayʿah remains in use today by some modern Muslim kingdoms such as Saudi Arabia and Morocco.

In the Qur'an 

After the Pledge of the Tree, which led to the Treaty of Hudaybiyyah, the following was revealed in the Qur'an commemorating and appreciating the pledge and those who made it:

History 
The bayʿah of Rizwan, a mass initiation of thousands of Muslims at the hands of Muhammad, is mentioned in the Qur'an. The tradition was continued by the caliphs.

In subsequent ages, it was associated with Sufi orders, and spiritual masters would initiate their followers. The practice still exists in Sufi orders around the world.

Content 
The Bayʿah varies across different times, places, and settings, but usually contains a relatively standardised formula such as the following:

"I give my allegiance to...To hear and obey in times of difficulty and comfort, in hardship and ease, and to endure being discriminated against, and not to dispute about rule with those in power, except in case of evident infidelity regarding that which there is a proof from Allah."

See also 
 Bay'ah (Ahmadiyya)
 Bay'ah Mosque

References 

Sufism
Islamic culture
Islamic jurisprudence
Politics of Morocco
Islamic terminology